Beth Sawyer is an American Republican Party politician who has represented the 3rd Legislative District in the New Jersey General Assembly since she took office on January 11, 2022.

A realtor and resident of Woolwich Township, New Jersey, Sawyer came in third in the 2018 race for township council.

New Jersey Assembly
In the 2022 general election, Sawyer, together with her Republican running mates Bethanne McCarthy Patrick in the Assembly and Edward Durr in the Senate, knocked off Democratic incumbents Stephen M. Sweeney in the Senate and John Burzichelli and Adam Taliaferro in the Assembly. Before the election, the district had been viewed as a "solidly 'blue'" safe district for Democrats.

Sawyer was one of a record seven new Republican Assemblywomen elected in the 2022 general election, joining seven Republican women incumbents who won re-election that year.

Committees 
Committee assignments for the current session are:
Aging and Senior Services
Telecommunications and Utilities

District 3 
Each of the 40 districts in the New Jersey Legislature has one representative in the New Jersey Senate and two members in the New Jersey General Assembly. Each of the 40 districts in the New Jersey Legislature has one representative in the New Jersey Senate and two members in the New Jersey General Assembly. Representatives from the 3rd District for the 2022—2023 Legislative Session are:
Senator Edward Durr (R)
Assemblywoman Bethanne McCarthy Patrick (R)
Assemblywoman Beth Sawyer (R)

Electoral history

Assembly

References

External links
Legislative webpage

Living people
Year of birth unknown
Politicians from Gloucester County, New Jersey
Republican Party members of the New Jersey General Assembly
People from Woolwich Township, New Jersey
Women state legislators in New Jersey
21st-century American politicians
21st-century American women politicians
Year of birth missing (living people)